The Europe and Africa Zone is one of the three zones of regional Davis Cup competition in 2011.

In the Europe and Africa Zone there are four different groups in which teams compete against each other to advance to the next group.

Participating teams

Seeds

Other Nations

Draw

 and  relegated to Group II in 2012.

First Round Matches

Slovenia vs. Finland

Ukraine vs. Netherlands

Portugal vs. Slovak Republic

Second Round Matches

Israel vs. Poland

Italy vs. Slovenia

South Africa vs. Netherlands

Portugal vs. Switzerland

Second-round play-offs

Poland vs. Finland

Ukraine vs. Slovak Republic

References

External links
Draw Results

Europe Africa Zone Group I
Davis Cup Europe/Africa Zone